Aisha Gomez (born July 22, 1981) is an American politician serving in the Minnesota House of Representatives since 2019. A member of the Minnesota Democratic–Farmer–Labor Party (DFL), Gomez represents District 62A, which includes parts of Minneapolis in Hennepin County, Minnesota.

Early life, education, and career
Gomez graduated from South High School in Minneapolis and attended the University of Minnesota, graduating with a B.S. in environmental science.

Gomez worked with the Women’s Environmental Institute for more than a decade and was a senior policy aide for Minneapolis City Council member Alondra Cano prior to running for the state legislature.

Minnesota House of Representatives
Gomez was elected to the Minnesota House of Representatives in 2018 and has been reelected every two years since. She first ran after four-term DFL incumbent Susan Allen announced she would not seek reelection.

Gomez serves as chair of the Taxes Committee, and sits on the Property Tax Division and Ways and Means Committee. From 2021-22, she served as chair of the Preventing Homelessness Division of the Housing Finance and Policy Committee. Gomez is a member of the House People of Color and Indigenous (POCI) Caucus.

At the start of the 2023 legislative session, Gomez authored a tax conformity bill that was the first bill to pass the House floor. It received unanimous bipartisan support in both chambers.

After the police murder of George Floyd, Gomez released a statement saying "This is why we talk about police abolition. There is no reform that can fix this system." She signed on to a letter written by U.S. Representative Ilhan Omar asking the Department of Justice to expand their investigation into the Minneapolis Police Department following the murder. Gomez has been critical of the Minneapolis Police, especially their use of chemical agent sprays on crowds. 

Gomez led the House's efforts to pass "The Driver's Licenses for All bill" which would allow unauthorized immigrants receive a driver's license. In 2003, Governor Tim Pawlenty revoked that privilege in the aftermath of the September 11 attacks. Gomez authored legislation to ensure municipal ID application information was private and not accessible by federal immigration authorities. During the COVID-19 pandemic, she introduced a bill to establish relief grants for immigrants not eligible for federal COVID relief like stimulus checks.

Gomez wrote an op-ed calling for a more racially equitable transit system, and investment in transit lines that run through historically marginalized communities. She signed on to a letter calling on the Biden administration to stop Line 3, a tar sands pipeline proposed to cut through Minnesota tribal lands. Gomez is a supporter of legalizing marijuana and has advocated for low taxes in order to "bring people out of the illicit market and into a regulated market."

Gomez opposed city plans to turn a site in the East Phillips neighborhood into a public works campus, instead of a community center and garden. She introduced a bill that would increase funding for shelter-based mental health services and require cities take certain steps before clearing out homeless encampments.

During the 2021 Minneapolis mayoral election, Gomez did not endorse incumbent Jacob Frey, and signed on to a letter that advocated for a "new mayor" that would do more to end racial disparities and increase public safety.

Electoral history

Personal life
Gomez resides in Minneapolis's Central neighborhood with her son, Andre. She is of both Hispanic/Latino and Arab ethnicity and identifies with the Jewish faith.

References

External links

 Official House of Representatives website
 Official campaign website

1981 births
Living people
Politicians from Minneapolis
Democratic Party members of the Minnesota House of Representatives
21st-century American politicians
21st-century American women politicians
Women state legislators in Minnesota
South High School (Minnesota) alumni
Jewish American state legislators in Minnesota